Irva Hertz-Picciotto (born  1948), is an environmental epidemiologist best known for her studies of autism. She is Professor and Chief, Division of Environmental and Occupational Health, Department of Public Health Sciences, at the University of California, Davis (UC-Davis). In addition, she is on the Research Faculty of the MIND (Medical Investigation of Neurodevelopmental Disorders) Institute at UC-Davis; is Deputy Director of the UC-Davis Center for Children's Environmental Health; and is on the faculty of the Center for Occupational and Environmental Health of the Universities of California at Berkeley, Davis, and San Francisco.  Hertz-Picciotto serves on the advisory board of the anti-toxic chemical NGO Healthy Child, Healthy World.

Biography
Hertz-Picciotto received four degrees from the University of California at Berkeley: a B.A. in Mathematics in 1970, an M.P.H. in Epidemiology in 1984, a M.A. in Biostatistics in 1985, and a Ph.D. in Epidemiology in 1989. She was on the faculty of the University of North Carolina at Chapel Hill for 12 years before joining UC-Davis.

She has published over 170 scientific articles, including:
 In 2009, Hertz-Picciotto and Delwiche analyzed data on autism in California and concluded that "younger ages at diagnosis, differential migration, changes in diagnostic criteria, and inclusion of milder cases do not fully explain the observed increases."  After publication of the article, she was quoted as saying that "It’s time to start looking for the environmental culprits responsible for the remarkable increase in the rate of autism in California."
 She was the senior author of a 2010 study that detected autism "clusters" in California associated with high levels of education among the children's parents.
 She was the senior author of another 2010 study using California data that showed that maternal age is associated with a higher risk of autism "regardless of the paternal age."

Selected research projects

Current research projects for which Hertz-Picciotto is principal investigator include:
 Childhood Autism Risks from Genetics and the Environment (CHARGE), a study begun in 2003.
 Markers of Autism Risk in Babies-Learning Early Signs (MARBLES), a study begun in 2006. It investigates biological and environmental exposures that may contribute to causing autism by following pregnant women who have a biological child with autism spectrum disorder.

Hertz-Picciotto also collaborates on the following studies, among others:
 National Children's Study to examine environmental influences on health and development, for which federal funding for the UC-Davis site was announced in 2007.
 Early Autism Risk Longitudinal Investigation (EARLI), a prospective study involving four sites that was launched in 2009 to elucidate risk factors and markers for autism spectrum disorder.

Selected awards, recognition, and service
 Abraham Lilienfeld Student Prize Paper, Society for Epidemiologic Research, 1988
 Delta Omega Honorary Society in Public Health, inducted in 1998
 Chair, Committee to Review the Health Effects in Vietnam Veterans of Exposure to Herbicides, Institute of Medicine, 2000
 McGavran Award for Excellence in Teaching, Gillings School of Global Public Health, University of North Carolina at Chapel Hill, 2001
 Lifetime National Associate of the National Academies, National Academy of Sciences and National Research Council, 2002
 President, International Society for Environmental Epidemiology, 2002−2003
 President, Society for Epidemiologic Research, 2006
 Chair, Committee on Breast Cancer and the Environment: The Scientific Evidence, Research Methodology, and Future Directions, Institute of Medicine, 2010-
 Editorial Board, Environmental Health
 Editorial Board, Epidemiologic Perspectives & Innovations
 Research Screening Committee, California Air Resources Board

Selected publications
 Hertz-Picciotto I, Swan SH, Neutra RR, Samuels SJ. Spontaneous abortions in relation to consumption of tap water: an application of methods from survival analysis to a pregnancy follow-up study. Am J Epidemiol. 1989 Jul;130(1):79-93. 
 Abrams B, Duncan D, Hertz-Picciotto I. A prospective study of dietary intake and acquired immune deficiency syndrome in HIV-seropositive homosexual men. J Acquir Immune Defic Syndr. 1993 Aug;6(8):949-58. 
 Arrighi HM, Hertz-Picciotto I. Definitions, sources, magnitude, effect modifiers, and strategies of reduction of the healthy worker effect. J Occup Med. 1993 Sep;35(9):890-2. 
 Arrighi HM, Hertz-Picciotto I. The evolving concept of the healthy worker survivor effect. Epidemiology. 1994 Mar;5(2):189-96. 
 Hertz-Picciotto I. Epidemiology and quantitative risk assessment: a bridge from science to policy. Am J Public Health. 1995 Apr;85(4):484-91. 
 Borja-Aburto VH, Hertz-Picciotto I, Rojas Lopez M, Farias P, Rios C, Blanco J. Blood lead levels measured prospectively and risk of spontaneous abortion. Am J Epidemiol. 1999 Sep 15;150(6):590-7. 
 Hopenhayn-Rich C, Browning SR, Hertz-Picciotto I, Ferreccio C, Peralta C, Gibb H. Chronic arsenic exposure and risk of infant mortality in two areas of Chile. Environ Health Perspect. 2000 Jul;108(7):667-73. 
 Bell EM, Hertz-Picciotto I, Beaumont JJ. A case-control study of pesticides and fetal death due to congenital anomalies.  Epidemiology. 2001 Mar;12(2):148-56. 
 James RA, Hertz-Picciotto I, Willman E, Keller JA, Charles MJ. Determinants of serum polychlorinated biphenyls and organochlorine pesticides measured in women from the child health and development study cohort, 1963-1967. Environ Health Perspect. 2002 Jul;110(7):617-24. 
 Dole N, Savitz DA, Hertz-Picciotto I, Siega-Riz AM, McMahon MJ, Buekens P. Maternal stress and preterm birth. Am J Epidemiol. 2003 Jan 1;157(1):14-24. 
 Hopenhayn C, Ferreccio C, Browning SR, Huang B, Peralta C, Gibb H, Hertz-Picciotto I. Arsenic exposure from drinking water and birth weight. Epidemiology. 2003 Sep;14(5):593-602. 
 Renwick AG, Barlow SM, Hertz-Picciotto I, Boobis AR, Dybing E, Edler L, Eisenbrand G, Greig JB, Kleiner J, Lambe J, Müller DJ, Smith MR, Tritscher A, Tuijtelaars S, van den Brandt PA, Walker R, Kroes R. Risk characterisation of chemicals in food and diet. Food Chem Toxicol. 2003 Sep;41(9):1211-71. 
 Hertz-Picciotto I, Croen LA, Hansen R, Jones CR, van de Water J, Pessah IN. The CHARGE study: an epidemiologic investigation of genetic and environmental factors contributing to autism. Environ Health Perspect. 2006 Jul;114(7):1119-25. 
 Hertz-Picciotto I, Park HY, Dostal M, Kocan A, Trnovec T, Sram R. Prenatal exposures to persistent and non-persistent organic compounds and effects on immune system development. Basic Clin Pharmacol Toxicol. 2008 Feb;102(2):146-54. 
 Hertz-Picciotto I, Delwiche L. The rise in autism and the role of age at diagnosis. Epidemiology. 2009 Jan;20(1):84-90. 
 Van Meter KC, Christiansen LE, Delwiche LD, Azari R, Carpenter TE, Hertz-Picciotto I. Geographic distribution of autism in California: a retrospective birth cohort analysis. Autism Res. 2010 Feb;3(1):19-29. 
 Shelton JF, Tancredi DJ, Hertz-Picciotto I. Independent and dependent contributions of advanced maternal and paternal ages to autism risk. Autism Res. 2010 Feb;3(1):30-9.

References

External links
 KQED. Autism: searching for causes. 2008 August 19. [Video which contains section on MARBLES study.]
 Marino Autism Institute: epidemiologic perspective. 2008 April 22. [Video of lecture by Hertz-Picciotto.]

1948 births
Autism researchers
American women epidemiologists
American epidemiologists
Living people
University of California, Berkeley alumni
UC Berkeley School of Public Health alumni
University of California, Davis faculty
21st-century American women